Spinal Column is a 1968 sculpture by Alexander Calder. It was commissioned for the San Diego Museum of Art in 1968 and was displayed in the May S. Marcy Sculpture Garden before being installed outside the museum. The work measures 118 in. x 100 in. x 90 in.

See also

 1968 in art

References

External links
 
 

1966 establishments in California
1966 sculptures
Abstract sculptures in California
Outdoor sculptures in San Diego
Sculptures of the San Diego Museum of Art
Sculptures by Alexander Calder